The Academy Drum and Bugle Corps is a World Class junior competitive drum and bugle corps based in Tempe, Arizona. The corps is a member of Drum Corps International (DCI).

History
In 2001, a group gathered in the Phoenix, Arizona area with the intent of starting a drum and bugle corps. They formed the Board of Directors of the Arizona Academy of the Performing Arts, a non-profit organization with the goal of "enhancing the culture of music, dance, and the performing arts in Arizona." They then formed The Academy Brass & Percussion Ensemble, which made numerous local appearances from 2001 to 2003, including at the Southwest Corps Connection.

In the summer of 2004, the corps added a color guard, changed the name to The Academy Drum and Bugle Corps, and entered the field of competition. They marched a short season of only four weeks and six shows in Arizona and California. The next year, the corps expanded its boundaries, performing in ten shows. In 2006, The Academy appeared in seven states, including the DCI Division II & III World Championships in Madison, Wisconsin, where the corps capped their season with the Division II title.

In 2007, The Academy moved into Division I (World Class) competition. In 2016, The Academy had their most successful season since moving to World Class. At the DCI World Championships in Indianapolis, The Academy placed 11th, becoming the first corps to make its Finals debut since the Seattle Cascades in 2002.

Show summary (2001–2022)
Source:

References

External links
Official website

Drum Corps International World Class corps
Musical groups established in 2001
2001 establishments in Arizona